Charles Richard Gough (born 5 April 1962) is a Scottish former professional footballer who played as a defender. 

Gough played in the successful Dundee United team of the early 1980s, winning the Scottish league title in 1982–83 and reaching the European Cup semi-final in 1984. Gough joined Tottenham Hotspur in 1986 and captained them in the 1987 FA Cup Final. He then moved to Rangers and captained them to nine successive Scottish league titles. He subsequently had spells with Kansas City Wizards, Rangers again, San Jose Clash, Nottingham Forest (on loan) and Everton.

He won 61 international caps for Scotland and played in the finals of three major tournaments.

Gough had a brief spell as manager of Livingston. He is currently an ambassador for Rangers.

Early life
Born in Stockholm, Sweden to a Scottish father (former Charlton Athletic player Charlie Gough) and a Swedish mother, Gough grew up in South Africa. He went to school at King Edward VII and Highlands North High School in Johannesburg, and began his career playing with the Wits University club.

Playing career

Club
Gough signed for Charlton Athletic as an apprentice professional in July 1978. However, he returned to play for Wits University for a brief period in 1979.

Gough signed for Dundee United in February 1980. He played for Dundee United for six seasons finishing with 23 goals in 165 appearances. Gough helped them to the Scottish League title in 1982–83. Dundee United also reached the 1983–84 European Cup semi-final against Roma during his time at the club.

In 1986, Gough was sold to English First Division club Tottenham Hotspur for £750,000 He played for slightly over a year and captained the Tottenham team which lost to Coventry City in the 1987 FA Cup Final.

Gough decided to return to Scotland, joining Rangers early in the 1987–88 season. In making the move he became the first Scottish player to be transferred to a Scottish team for over £1,000,000. His debut was at Tannadice Park, in a defeat against former club Dundee United. He was named the SFWA Footballer of the Year in 1988–89. Gough remained at Ibrox until 1997, captaining the side that achieved nine consecutive League titles. He won 9 league titles, 3 Scottish Cups and 6 League Cups at Rangers. In all, he played 427 league games with Rangers, scoring 37 goals.

In May 1997, Gough left the United Kingdom to play in the United States' nascent professional league, Major League Soccer, signing for Kansas City Wizards. In October 1997, he returned to Rangers due to injury issues at Ibrox. He resumed his MLS career with the San Jose Clash. He played 36 games in total in MLS, scored 2 goals and he was named in the MLS Best XI for his 1997 season with the Wizards. Gough also went on loan to Nottingham Forest from March until May 1999, playing seven matches as the club was relegated.

After leaving San Jose Clash he linked up with former boss Walter Smith at Everton. He played two seasons at Goodison Park making 38 appearances and scoring once against Southampton. During his time at Everton he was made captain for the 2000–01 season and retired from playing in May 2001.

Gough agreed to play as a guest for Australian team Northern Spirit in October 2001, but had to withdraw due to injury.

International
Gough was also a regular in the Scotland national team in the 1980s. He made his debut against Switzerland in 1983, and went on to gain 61 caps. Gough played in two World Cups (1986 and 1990). He captained his country in the 1992 European Championships in his birthplace, Sweden.

Gough scored six international goals. In 1985, he scored the only goal of the game when Scotland beat England 1–0 at Hampden Park. He scored two goals in February 1989 in a 3–2 World Cup qualifier win away to Cyprus, with the second being scored in the sixth minute of added time.

His international career was ended prematurely however, after he was critical of coaches Andy Roxburgh and Craig Brown and withdrew himself from further selection.

Managerial career
On 30 November 2004, Gough landed his first and only managerial position with the then Scottish Premier League side Livingston. After a difficult season where the club battled relegation, Gough resigned and cited disagreements with the club's owner over the budget for signing players as the reason. The club was also fined £15,000 by the SFA for a breach of transfer regulations over the signing of Hassan Kachloul during Gough's time as manager although there was no suggestion that Gough himself was responsible for the breach of regulations.

Later career
Gough supported the Rangers Supporters' Trust and Dave King's takeover of Rangers, and was appointed as a global ambassador for the club on 21 September 2015.

Personal life
Gough has resided in San Diego, California, since 1997.

Career statistics

International appearances

International goals
Scores and results list Scotland's goal tally first.

Honours

Club
Dundee United
Scottish Premier Division: 1982–83
Forfarshire Cup: 1979–80, 1984–85

Rangers
Scottish Premier Division: 1988–89, 1989–90, 1990–91, 1991–92, 1992–93, 1993–94, 1994–95, 1995–96, 1996–97
Scottish Cup: 1991–92, 1992–93, 1995–96
Scottish League Cup: 1987–88, 1988–89, 1990–91, 1992–93, 1993–94, 1996–97

Scotland
The Rous Cup: 1985

Individual
SPFA Players' Player of the Year: 1985–86
SFWA Footballer of the Year: 1988–89
Scottish Football Hall of Fame
Scotland national football team roll of honour : 1990

See also
 List of Scotland international footballers born outside Scotland
 List of Scotland national football team captains
 List of Scottish football families

References

External links

1962 births
1986 FIFA World Cup players
1990 FIFA World Cup players
British emigrants to South Africa 
Dundee United F.C. players
Association football defenders
Everton F.C. players
Expatriate soccer players in the United States
Hollywood United players
Sporting Kansas City players
Living people
Livingston F.C. managers
Nottingham Forest F.C. players
Footballers from Stockholm
Premier League players
Rangers F.C. players
San Jose Earthquakes players
Scotland international footballers
Scottish people of Swedish descent
Scottish expatriate footballers
Scottish Football League players
Scottish football managers
Scottish footballers
English Football League players
Scottish expatriate sportspeople in South Africa
Tottenham Hotspur F.C. players
UEFA Euro 1992 players
Bidvest Wits F.C. players
Scottish Football Hall of Fame inductees
Expatriate soccer players in South Africa
Scottish Premier League managers
Major League Soccer players
Major League Soccer All-Stars
Scotland under-21 international footballers
Scottish expatriate sportspeople in the United States
Rangers F.C. non-playing staff
FA Cup Final players